333: A Bibliography of the Science-Fantasy Novel is a bibliography of English science fiction and fantasy books compiled and edited by Joseph H. Crawford, Jr., James J. Donahue and Donald M. Grant.  It was first published by The Grandon Company in an edition of 450 paperback and 50 hardback copies.  The hardback was issued without jacket.  The book gives plot descriptions of 333  novels published prior to 1951.

References

1953 non-fiction books
American non-fiction books
Fantasy bibliographies
Books about books
Science fiction studies
Published bibliographies